Double marginalization is a vertical externality that occurs when two firms with market power (i.e., not in a situation of perfect competition), at different vertical levels in the same supply chain, apply a mark-up to their prices. This is caused by the prospect of facing a steep demand curve slope, prompting the firm to mark-up the price beyond its marginal costs. Double marginalization is clearly negative from a welfare point of view, as the double markup induces a deadweight loss, because the retail price is higher than the optimal monopoly price a vertically integrated company would set, leading to underproduction. Thus all social groups are negatively affected because the overall profit for the company is lower, the consumer has to pay more and a smaller amount of units are consumed.

Example
Consider an industry with the following characteristics - 

The manufacturer's profit is 8, and the retailer's profit is 4. 

Not only is the total profit lower than in the integrated scenario, but the price is higher, thus reducing the consumer surplus.

Solutions
There are numerous mechanisms to prevent or at least limit double marginalization. These include, among others, the following.

 Vertical integration: In the case of double marginalization, both firms within the same supply chain are increasing their prices beyond their marginal costs which create deadweight losses. By vertically integrating, these deadweight losses will be eliminated and the vertically integrated company can incorporate a pricing strategy that is conducive to profit and welfare maximization.  
 Franchise fee: The upstream firm sells the downstream firm the right to distribute their product through a lump sum fixed fee known as the Franchise Fee. The upstream firm will sell each unit of their product at the same price as the marginal cost of production, so their profits will be derived from the franchise fee, further indicating that the downstream firm should sell at the monopoly price for profit maximization.
 Nonlinear pricing: The first company does not charge a quantity-independent price per item, but makes the unit price dependent on the total quantity sold. If the discount scheme is optimally selected, it corresponds exactly to the franchise solution.
 Resale price maintenance: The first company prescribes the second the selling price of the final product.
 Competition: If a manufacturer sells its products to competing retailers, the competition among them will reduce the second markup.

Note that the above mechanisms only solve the problem of double marginalization; from an overall welfare point of view, the problem of monopoly pricing remains. It should also be noted that while some of the solutions presented above, such as mergers, have a positive effect in minimizing the double markup present within the vertical competition, but it damages the horizontal competition.

References

Economics models
Competition (economics)
Imperfect competition
Market structure